Ormside is a civil parish in the Eden District, Cumbria, England. It contains nine listed buildings that are recorded in the National Heritage List for England. Of these, one is listed at Grade I, the highest of the three grades, one is at Grade II*, the middle grade, and the others are at Grade II, the lowest grade.  The parish contains the villages of Great Ormside and Little Ormside, and is otherwise rural.  The most important buildings are an 11th-century church and a 14th-century hall;  both of these and structures associated with them are listed.  The other listed buildings are a house, farmhouses and farm buildings.


Key

Buildings

References

Citations

Sources

Lists of listed buildings in Cumbria